= Crypt Gallery, Seaford =

British Heritage listed crypt

The Crypt Gallery is a series of medieval vaulted underground chambers in Seaford, East Sussex, which dates from the mid-13th century. The crypt is believed to have been located beneath a medieval merchant premises or a courthouse. The area is currently being used as an exhibition space, and is run by the Sussex Contemporary Illustrators and Printmakers.

The structure is the oldest surviving building in Seaford, aside from a small portion of the nearby church.

The medieval crypt is officially listed on the National Heritage List for England, as a Scheduled Monument.
